Lipovljani is a municipality in Croatian Slavonia in the Sisak-Moslavina County. It has a population of 4,101 (2001 census), 85.7% which are Croats. Other notable minorities are Ukrainians (4.3%), Slovaks (3%), and Czechs (2.4%). Lipovljani has the oldest Ukrainian Greek Catholic Church because it was founded by early Ukrainian immigrants at the time of the Austria-Hungary Empire.

History
In the late 19th and early 20th century, Lipovljani was part of the Požega County of the Kingdom of Croatia-Slavonia.

Notable people 
Nina Kraljić, Croatian singer

See also
Lipovljani railway station

References

Municipalities of Croatia
Slavonia
Populated places in Sisak-Moslavina County